Marius Beraru (born 28 November 1920) is a Romanian former footballer and manager.

International career
Marius Beraru made one appearance at international level for Romania, in a friendly which ended 2–2 against Croatia.

Notes

References

External links
Marius Beraru at Labtof.ro

1920 births
Romanian footballers
Romania international footballers
Association football forwards
Liga I players
Liga II players
FC Sportul Studențesc București players
Romanian football managers
Footballers from Chișinău
Possibly living people